Michael Zisser (born 5 October 1966 is a retired Austrian football defender and later manager.

References

1966 births
Living people
Austrian footballers
Grazer AK players
FC Admira Wacker Mödling players
SK Rapid Wien players
TSV Hartberg players
SV Spittal players
Association football defenders
Austria international footballers
Austrian football managers